Paldal-gu is the central district of the city of Suwon in Gyeonggi-do, South Korea.

Administrative divisions
Paldal-gu is divided into the following "dong"s.
Godeung-dong (고등동)
Hwaseo-dong (화서동), divided in turn into Hwaseo 1 and 2 dong
Ingye-dong (인계동)
Ji-dong (지동)
Haenggung-dong (행궁동), divided in turn into Paldalno 1 to 3 Ga, Namchang-dong, Yeong-dong, Jung-dong, Gucheon-dong, Namsu-dong, Buksu-dong, Maehyang-dong, Sinpung-dong and Jangan-dong
Maegyo-dong (매교동), divided in turn into Maegyo-dong and Gyo-dong
Maesan-dong (매산동), divided in turn into Maesanno 1 to 3 Ga
Uman-dong (우만동), divided in turn into Uman 1 and 2 dong

Critical Infrastructure
 Gyeonggi-do Provincial Office
 Suwon City Hall
 Paldal-gu office
 Gyeonggi-do Culture ＆ Art Center
 Suwon World Cup Stadium

See also
Suwon
Gwonseon-gu
Jangan-gu
Yeongtong-gu

External links
City government website 

Paldal-gu website 

Districts of Suwon